The 2010 Asian Aerobic Gymnastics Championships were the second edition of the Asian Aerobic Gymnastics Championships, and were held in Ho Chi Minh City, Vietnam from December 16 to December 18, 2010.

Participating nations

Senior events
 Men's individual
 Women's individual
 Mixed pair
 Trio
 Group

Medal table

References

A
Asian Gymnastics Championships
2010 in Vietnamese sport
International gymnastics competitions hosted by Vietnam